Reveries of a Solitary Walker (Italian: Fantasticherie di un passeggiatore solitario), also known as Reveries of a Lonely Walker and Reveries of a Solitary Stroller, is a 2014 Italian live-action/claymation fantasy film directed by Paolo Gaudio, inspired by Reveries of a Solitary Walker by Jean-Jacques Rousseau. It was screened at the Sci-Fi-London festival, and later released in the US by Uncork’d Entertainment.

Plot 
1876. Jean Jacques Renou is a penniless old writer who writes the novel Reveries of a Lonely Walker, centered on the fantastic story of a child lost in the woods. Nowadays, the philosophy student Theo discovers Renou's novel, which has remained unfinished, and is so obsessed with it that he tries to bring it to fruition.

Awards
2014
La Samain du Cinéma Fantastique: Grand Prix du Festival
2015:
Fantafestival: Mario Bava award
Boston Science Fiction Film Festival: Best World Film
Fantastic Cinema, Little Rock: Audience Award
TOHorror Film Fest, Turin: Best Film and Antonio Margheriti Prize for Creativity
FKM – Festival de cinema fantástico da Coruña: Best Visual Effects and Best Soundtrack by Sandro Di Stefano
Premio Cinearti La chioma di Berenice: Best Soundtrack
2017
MedFF Mediterranean Film Festival: Best Animation

See also
List of animated feature films of 2014

References

External links
 

Italian animated films
Italian fantasy films
Films based on books
2014 fantasy films
2010s stop-motion animated films
Films with live action and animation
2010s Italian films